The women's hockey event at the 2018 Commonwealth Games was held at the Gold Coast Hockey Centre from 5 to 14 April 2018.

Umpires
Twelve umpires for the women's event were appointed by the International Hockey Federation.

 Nur Hafizah Azman (MAS)
 Jo Cumming (NZL)
 Durga Devi (IND)
 Ayanna McClean (TTO)
 Aleisha NeUmann (AUS)
 Lelia Sacre (CAN)
 Emma Shelbourn (ENG)
 Cookie Tan (SGP)
 Wanri Venter (RSA)
 Sarah Wilson (SCO)
 Cathy Wright (WAL)
 Aleesha Unka (NZL)

Results
All times are local (UTC+10)

Preliminary round

Pool A

Pool B

Classification matches

Fifth to tenth place classification

Ninth and tenth place

Seventh and eighth place

Fifth and sixth place

First to fourth place classification

Semi-finals

Bronze medal match

Gold medal match

Statistics

Final standings

Goalscorers

References

2018
Women's tournament
2018 in women's field hockey
International women's field hockey competitions hosted by Australia
Com